Tongra is a village in the Ranishwar CD block in the Dumka Sadar subdivision of the Dumka district in the Indian state of Jharkhand.

Geography

Location

Overview
The map shows a large area, which is a plateau with low hills, except in the eastern portion where the Rajmahal hills intrude into this area and the Ramgarh hills are there. The south-western portion is just a rolling upland. The entire area is overwhelmingly rural with only small pockets of urbanisation.

Note: The full screen map is interesting. All places marked on the map are linked in the full screen map and one can easily move on to another page of his/her choice. Enlarge the full screen map to see what else is there – one gets railway connections, many more road connections and so on.

Area

Demographics
According to the 2011 Census of India, Tongra had a total population of 989, of which 476 (48%) were males and 513 (52%) were females. Population in the age range 0–6 years was 116. The total number of literate persons in Tongra was 873 (54.64% of the population over 6 years).

Civic administration

Police station
There is a police station at Tongra.

Education
Government Middle School Tongra is a Hindi-medium coeducational institution established in 1975. It has facilities for teaching from class I to class VIII.

References

Villages in Dumka district